Tea with pine nuts, or in French Thé aux pignons is a traditional Tunisian culinary specialty. This type of maghrebi mint tea (or geranium tea sometimes in winter) is typically served during occasions such as weddings, family meetings or meetings between friends. The pine nuts that accompany it and make it special can be replaced by almonds or roasted peanuts.

Preparation 
Tunisian tea with pine nuts can be prepared with green tea leaves (unfermented tea) or black tea leaves (also called red tea in Tunisia).

Water is boiled in a teapot while a handful of tea leaves are rinsed in boiling water before boiling over low heat in the teapot half-filled with water; sugar is added to it as desired. The tea is ready when it loses its bitter taste. You can add mint leaves — or geranium leaves or essence if using black tea — and let them steep for a while before serving the tea.

Pine nuts are best toasted lightly over very low heat, but they can also be served plain.

Service 
A few teaspoons of pine nuts are placed in each glass before pouring the hot tea. The pine nuts float if the tea is very sweet, otherwise they remain at the bottom of the glass.

It is also possible to serve the tea without pine nuts and let the guests put the desired amount of pine nuts in their glasses.

Tea with pine nuts can be drunk late morning, afternoon or evening.

References

 
Tunisian culture